Zhonghuamen station, is a station of Line 1 of the Nanjing Metro.

Around the station
 Gate of China. The metro station is named after the gate.
 Zhonghuamen railway station

References

Railway stations in Jiangsu
Railway stations in China opened in 2005
Nanjing Metro stations